Missing Link is an extended play (EP) by Australian musician Nick Murphy. It is the first musical collection to be released under his birth name. In a press release, Murphy said “Chet Faker was me trying to prove something to myself. But my tastes are pretty dynamic, and I realized I’ve spent time resisting that. Now I want to put everything in. It’s not conceptual anymore. It’s just me, and it made sense to show that in a name. It feels like a rediscovery.”  Adding the Missing Link EP is “a bridge between what's out and what's coming”

Track listing
Notes: All tracks written and produced by Nick Murphy, except for "Your Time", alongside Kaytranada.

Personnel 
Credits adapted from the liner notes of Missing Link vinyl.
 Benjamin Gordon – artwork, visual direction
 Kaytranada – producer 
 Mitchell McLennan – photography

Release history

Charts

References

2017 EPs
EPs by Australian artists
Chet Faker albums